The dusky crawler (Sticharium clarkae) is a species of clinid native to the coast of southern Australia, where it lives around coastal outcrops in which it can find partially sheltered, sandy bays. The specific name of this  clinid honours  ichthyologist  Eugenie Clark (1922-2015) of the University of Maryland.

References

clarkae
Fish described in 1980
Taxa named by Victor G. Springer